Elsthorpe is a hamlet in the South Kesteven district of Lincolnshire, England.

These, on a hill ridge, consist of a sunken road, sites of buildings, and fish ponds.

References

External links

Hamlets in Lincolnshire
South Kesteven District